The 1884 Penn Quakers football team was an American football team that represented the University of Pennsylvania during the 1884 college football season. The team compiled a 5–1–1 record. Alexander Gray was the team captain, and there was no coach.

Schedule

References

Penn
Penn Quakers football seasons
Penn Quakers football